Kalamity is a 2010 American psychological thriller film starring Nick Stahl, Jonathan Jackson and Beau Garrett.

Cast
Nick Stahl as Billy Klepack
Jonathan Jackson as Stanley Keller
Christopher M. Clark as Christian Phillips
Beau Garrett as Alice
Robert Forster as Tom Klepack
Alona Tal as Ashley
Patricia Kalember as Terry Klepack
Sammi Hanratty as Barbie Klepack

Reception
The film has a 0% rating on Rotten Tomatoes. On Metacritic, the film has a score of 28 out of a 100 based on 11 critics, indicating "generally unfavorable reviews".

Glenn Heath Jr. of Slant Magazine gave the film one and a half stars out of four, explaining his rating by "The brooding main characters in James M. Hausler's Kalamity take indulgent suffering to another level".

Frank Scheck of The Hollywood Reporter called the film "[a] pallid, unconvincing thriller" that "carries the battle between the sexes to literal extremes".

References

External links

American psychological thriller films
2010s English-language films
2010s American films